Cuadernos (Spanish: Notebooks) was a Spanish-language magazine that was published in Paris, France, in the period 1953–1965. Its full title was Cuadernos del Congreso por la Libertad de la Cultura. It was one of the publications of the Congress for Cultural Freedom.

History and profile
Cuadernos was launched by the Congress for Cultural Freedom in 1953 which targeted Spanish people and Latin Americans. The first issue appeared in June 1954. The editor of the magazine was a Spaniard politician, Julián Gorkin. During his editorship another Spaniard politician Ignacio Iglesias also edited the magazine which was published on a quarterly basis. Gorkin was replaced by a Spaniard exile in Paris, Luis Araquistáin, as editor of the magazine in late 1950s. However, due to the death of Araquistáin a Colombian diplomat Germán Arciniegas was named as the editor of the magazine. 

The content of Cuadernos included Hispanic poems, articles on anti-Soviet propaganda and political and cultural news from the European and Latin American countries. In 1961 the frequency of the magazine was switched to monthly. The magazine was closed by the Congress in 1965 due to its low popularity and its lower levels of circulation although it targeted Hispanic people in Spain and Latin America. The magazine never enjoyed high levels of circulation like Encounter or Der Monat, other magazines of the Congress. The last issue, the 100th issue, of Cuadernos was published in September 1965. Mundo Nuevo, another Spanish language magazine, succeeded Cuadernos.

References

External links

1953 establishments in France
1965 disestablishments in France
Cold War propaganda
Congress for Cultural Freedom
Defunct political magazines published in France
Magazines established in 1953
Magazines disestablished in 1965
Magazines published in Paris
Monthly magazines published in France
Propaganda newspapers and magazines
Spanish-language magazines
CIA activities in France